Generation Now may refer to:

 the American Hip-Hop record label founded by DJ Drama
 the 501(c) organization allegedly paid during the Ohio nuclear bribery scandal
 a professional wrestling show, see Generation Next (professional wrestling)
 a children's theatre partnership, see Children's Theatre Company
 a TV show that ran from 2012–2014 on Christian Television Network

See also 
 Now Generation, a 2014 Brazilian telenovela
 Now Generation Band, a Jamaican reggae band